Lionel Herbert Clarke (July 20, 1859 – August 29, 1921) was a Guelph-born businessman and the 12th Lieutenant Governor of Ontario, Canada. In 1911, he was appointed the first chairman of the Toronto Harbour Commission

The son of William Clarke and Clara Piggott Strange, he was educated in Port Hope. In 1891, Clarke married Anne Clara Gertrude Small.

In 1893, Lionel partnered with "barley king" Wilmot Deloui Matthews as L. H. Clarke and Company, malt dealers, then in 1900 they established the Canada Malting Company Limited of which Clarke became president in 1908.

Clarke was appointed lieutenant governor November 20, 1919. Diagnosed with stomach cancer, Clarke died at Government House, Toronto. After a state funeral, he was buried in Mount Pleasant Cemetery, Toronto.

References

Dictionary of Canadian Biography Online http://www.biographi.ca/EN/009004-119.01-e.php?id_nbr=8078

1859 births
1921 deaths
Businesspeople from Ontario
Canadian brewers
Lieutenant Governors of Ontario
People from Guelph
Deaths from stomach cancer
Deaths from cancer in Ontario